Leonidas Eduardo Proaño Villalba (1910 in San Antonio de Ibarra, Ecuador – 1988 in Quito, Ecuador) was an Ecuadorian prelate and theologian. He served as the bishop of Riobamba from 1954 to 1985. He was a candidate for the Nobel Peace Prize and is considered one of the most important figures in Ecuadorian liberation theology.

Biography
Proaño was ordained as a priest in 1936 and soon became interested in the latest trends Catholic social doctrine. Within the Ibarra diocese, he created the Juventud Obrera Cristiana (Christian Youth Workers). He was named bishop of Riobamba in 1954. From his cathedral in Riobamba, he fought constantly to introduce social justice in relations with indigenous people and to promote indigenous access to public life and political power (he thus became known as "the bishop of the Indians").

He enthusiastically adopted the thesis of liberation theology. In 1960, he created the Escuelas Radiofónicas Populares, with a clear educational goal. In 1962, he created the Center of Studies and Social Action to aid the development of indigenous communities. In 1973, he was accused of guerrilla warfare and had to stand trial in Rome, but he was cleared of all charges. In 1976, he was jailed during the dictatorship of Guillermo Rodríguez Lara.

In 1985, he renounced the bishopric and was named president of the Pastoral Indígena.

Writings
 Rupito (1953)
 Creo en el Hombre y en la Comunidad (1977)
 El Evangelio Subversivo (1987)
 Concienciación, Evangelización y Política (1987).

Bibliography
 Leonidas Proaño: el obispo de los pobres, 1989, Francisco Enríquez Bermeo,

References

External links
Profile of Mons. Proaño www.catholic-hierarchy.org
Leonidas Proaño: una obra emancipadora desde el territorio

1910 births
1988 deaths
20th-century Roman Catholic bishops in Ecuador
Liberation theologians
People from Ibarra Canton
Roman Catholic bishops of Riobamba